Wilfred Blake (29 November 1854 – unknown)  was an English first-class cricketer, who had the distinction of playing for both Yorkshire County Cricket Club and Lancashire County Cricket Club in his brief three match career.

Blake was born in Embsay, Skipton, Yorkshire, and was a right-handed batsman and right arm, roundarm, medium pace bowler. He made his debut for Lancashire in the Roses Match at Fartown, Huddersfield in 1877.  Batting at number 9 in Lancashire's first innings he made a creditable 26, before being bowled by Armitage in a match won by Lancashire by nine wickets. This proved to be his only game for the red rose county, and he re-appeared in 1880 for Yorkshire against Derbyshire  on the same ground.  He scored 16 in a match won by Yorkshire by an innings.

His final first-class game was against Gloucestershire at the Clifton College Close Ground in August 1880.  He was bowled by W. G. Grace for seven in the first innings, and bowled by his brother G. F. Grace in the second for 21, as Gloucestershire ran out winners by six wickets.

Blake then vanished from the first-class scene, and indeed the history books as the date and circumstances of his death are not known.	

Overall, he scored 70 runs at an average of 17.5.  He took one wicket for seventeen runs for Yorkshire.

References

External links
Cricinfo Profile
Cricket Archive Statistics

1854 births
Year of death unknown
Yorkshire cricketers
People from Skipton
Lancashire cricketers
English cricketers